The 2003 Pacific typhoon season was a slightly below average yearlong period of tropical cyclogenesis exhibiting the development of 45 tropical depressions, of which 21 became named storms; of those, 14 became typhoons. Though every month with the exception of February and March featured tropical activity, most storms developed from May through October. During the season, tropical cyclones affected the Philippines, Japan, China, the Korean Peninsula, Indochina, and various islands in the western Pacific.

The season ran year-round, with the first storm, Yanyan, developing west of the Marshall Islands on January 15. In April, Typhoon Kujira became one of the longest-lasting Pacific typhoons in history and attained climatological records for its unusually early impacts. Typhoon Imbudo in July caused several deaths and extensive damage across the Philippines and China. In September, Typhoon Maemi became one of the costliest typhoons in recorded history after striking South Korea; Maemi was also the most intense tropical cyclone of the season with a minimum barometric pressure of 910 mbar (hPa; 26.87 inHg). In late November, Typhoon Lupit devastated areas of Yap State in the Federated States of Micronesia. The season closed with the dissipation of a tropical depression east of the Philippines on December 27.

The scope of this article is limited to the Pacific Ocean, north of the equator and west of the International Date Line. Storms that form east of the date line and north of the equator are called hurricanes; see 2003 Pacific hurricane season. Tropical Storms formed in the entire west Pacific basin are assigned a name by the Tokyo Typhoon Center. Tropical depressions in this basin monitored by the Joint Typhoon Warning Center (JTWC) have the "W" suffix added to their number. Tropical depressions that enter or form in the Philippine area of responsibility are assigned a name by the Philippine Atmospheric, Geophysical and Astronomical Services Administration or PAGASA. This can often result in the same storm having two names.

Seasonal forecasts 

On March 5, 2003, meteorologists from the University College London at the Tropical Storm Risk (TSR) Consortium issued an extended range forecast for the typhoon season, noting the likelihood of near average tropical cyclone activity as a result of projected neutral sea surface temperatures. The forecast indicated the potential for 26.2 tropical storms, compared to the 10– and 30-year average of 27.8 and 26.3 storms, respectively. The following month, the group raised their forecast for tropical storms to 26.7, indicating a slightly above average season. Over next two months, however, fluctuations in sea surface temperatures, particularly those in the Central Pacific, caused the group to revise their predictions downward and indicated the probability for a slightly below average typhoon season in their June forecast. A rise in sea surface temperatures in the following months prompted the forecasting group to once again raise their forecasts to indicate a near-average season in their final August forecast update, which predicted 27 tropical storms. The group was very accurate in their forecasts, with their April and August forecasts being the most accurate.

Similarly, meteorologists working with the City University of Hong Kong issued a seasonal projection on April 24, 2003, indicating the likelihood of a normal or below normal season with 29 total tropical cyclones, 26 tropical storms, and 16 typhoons. As with the TSR, the group primarily based their forecast numbers on the prevailing status of the El Niño-Southern Oscillation. The City University of Hong Kong revised their forecasts on June 24, 2003, indicating a slight increase of total tropical cyclones to 30. The group was also accurate in their forecasts for the entirety of the Northwest Pacific, though their specialized forecasts for the South China Sea were substantially off.

During the year, the Japan Meteorological Agency (JMA) issued advisories on tropical cyclones west of the International Date Line to the Malay Peninsula, and north of the equator; this was due to the agency's status as the official Regional Specialized Meteorological Center, as designated by the World Meteorological Organization in 1989. The JMA issued forecasts and analyses four times a day, beginning at 0000 UTC and continuing every six hours. The JMA issued forecasts based on a climatological tropical cyclone forecast model. The agency estimated 10 minute sustained winds and barometric pressure based on the Dvorak technique and numerical weather prediction. The JTWC also issued warnings on storms within the basin, operating from Pearl Harbor in Hawaii to represent the interests of the United States Armed Forces in the Indian and Pacific Oceans.

Season summary 

Throughout the season, sea surface temperatures within the western equatorial Pacific were above normal, including those in the South China Sea. Areas of convection persisted year-round in the lower latitudes, particularly around the Philippines. Atmospheric divergence was also prevalent in the same regions, resulting in enhanced tropical cyclogenesis east of the Philippines in 2003; the mean region of development of tropical systems during the year was more southwest than the 1971–2000 30-year average. In 2003, the JMA monitored 21 tropical cyclones of at least tropical storm intensity; of those, 14 reached typhoon intensity. Though the number of tropical storms was below average, the ratio between tropical storms and typhoons was 66% greater than normal. The Philippine Atmospheric, Geophysical and Astronomical Services Administration (PAGASA) monitored three additional cyclones of at least tropical storm intensity that were not monitored by the JMA.

The season began with the formation of Tropical Storm Yanyan on January 15. After its dissipation five days later, no tropical cyclones of at least tropical storm intensity developed over the next two months. This period of inactivity ended with the formation of Typhoon Kujira in mid-April; Kujira was one of the longest lived Pacific storms on record and was the first typhoon with 1-minute sustained winds of at least  in April since Typhoon Isa in 1997. Tropical activity was enhanced from May to June, and during this period the JMA monitored four tropical storms, while the PAGASA monitored a fifth storm off the eastern Philippines. Three of the four tropical storms monitored by the JMA approached or hit Japan, including Typhoon Soudelor, which brought heavy rainfall and wind across the Ryukyu Islands and the Korean Peninsula.

Tropical activity once again declined towards the second half of June and first half of July. The second half of July, however, featured the development of typhoons Imbudo and Koni, which both tracked westward across the Philippines before striking areas near Saipan and other regions of southeastern China. Imbudo caused the deaths of 78 people and US$383 million in damage. August was a highly active month for tropical cyclogenesis, with a total of six tropical storms monitored by the JMA, JTWC, and PAGASA. This included typhoons Krovanh and Dujuan, which also struck southeastern China. Typhoon Etau earlier in the month made landfall in Japan, resulting in 17 deaths.

Activity was somewhat below average in September, with only one tropical cyclone making landfall, Maemi. However, Maemi was the strongest tropical cyclone of the season and was the costliest with roughly US$4.8 billion in damage, mostly in South Korea. Tropical cyclogenesis and activity continued to decline after August, with October featuring only three tropical storms. However, two, Ketsana and Parma, reached typhoon intensity; both stayed away from land. November featured less storms but was climatologically average, with two typhoons developing. The second typhoon, Lupit, devastated portions of Yap State, resulting in approximately $1.7 million in damage. In December, the JTWC and PAGASA monitored a sole tropical system east of the Philippines, though the JMA did not monitor or classify any tropical cyclones during the month.

Systems

Tropical Storm Yanyan 

On January 11, the JTWC began monitoring the disturbance that would eventually develop into Yanyan near the International Date Line. As the system tracked westward, it gradually moved into a more favorable environment for tropical cyclogenesis. On January 14, surface observations indicated that the low-pressure area had developed a closed, low-level circulation center indicative of a tropical cyclone, satellite imagery remained inconclusive. Nonetheless, the JMA classified the pressure area as a tropical depression west of the Marshall Islands at 0600 UTC on January 15. The JTWC would follow suit by classifying the storm as such at 1800 UTC later that day. At the time, the depression was tracking west-northwest under the influence of a subtropical ridge to the north. Over the next day the system waned in convective activity before resuming its previous track and accelerating. At 0000 UTC on January 17, the JTWC upgraded the system to tropical storm intensity, though the storm remained nameless as the JMA continued to classify it as a tropical depression.

Throughout January 17 the tropical storm would again oscillate in strength, resulting in a brief downgrade by the JTWC to tropical depression intensity. However, an increase in deep convection resulted in its reclassification as a tropical storm at 1800 UTC that day, followed by the JMA upgrading the system to tropical storm intensity at 1200 UTC on January 18. As such, the storm received the name Yanyan. At roughly the same time, the tropical cyclone began to stall east of the Mariana Islands and curve sharply northeastward. Steered by the same nearby subtropical ridge, Yanyan would continue to track towards the northeast into a less favorable tropical cyclone environment. The JMA downgraded Yanyan to tropical depression at 1200 UTC on January 20 before the storm transitioned into an extratropical cyclone as its low-level circulation center decoupled from the primary mass of convection due to strong wind shear. At 0000 UTC, both the JTWC and JMA discontinued the monitoring of Yanyan.

Typhoon Kujira (Amang) 

Kujira developed from a broad area of disturbed weather as a tropical depression on April 9 well removed from any landmasses. Shortly after development, Kujira quickly intensified in its early stages, and was upgraded to a tropical storm just two days after cyclogenesis. Strengthening slowed afterwards, though the storm attained typhoon intensity on April 14. Following peak intensity, Kujira would begin to track northwest and oscillate in strength, cresting an additional two times in intensity. On April 21, the typhoon was downgraded to tropical storm intensity and began to track erratically for several days east of Taiwan. However, on April 24, Kujira would resume a northward track and begin to weaken, and on April 24 was downgraded to tropical depression strength as it made landfall on Kyushu. Following landfall, Kujira transitioned into an extratropical cyclone on April 25, which persisted until crossing the International Dateline towards the end of April 2003.

Shortly after developing, Kujira caused two fatalities in Pohnpei in addition to minor agricultural and infrastructural damage; similar effects were felt in Guam. Several days later, the typhoon prompted cyclone warnings and other precautionary measures in the Philippines after forecasts indicated the potential for strong winds and rain. However, ultimately any effects in the archipelago associated with Kujira remained minimal. The typhoon also prompted warning products in Taiwan, making it the first April typhoon since 1978 to cause such a feat. Unlike in the Philippines, however, Kujira would bring significant rainfall to Taiwan. Effects from the typhoon were most significant in Japan, particularly in the Ryukyu Islands. Strong winds, rain, and waves caused US$230,000 (¥27.8 million) in agricultural damage on Ishigaki Island. One person was killed due to injuries resulting from the waves. Overall, despite its distance away from land and weak intensity at the time of its sole landfall, Kujira resulted in three fatalities.

Tropical Depression 03W (Batibot) 

An area of convection formed on May 16 to the southwest of Palau, located within an area of weak wind shear. The next day, the JMA and the JTWC both classified the system as a tropical depression. The convection was disorganized in association with multiple circulation centers, although it gradually organized. Moving westward initially, the depression turned more to the north into an area of increasing wind shear. On May 19, the JTWC upgraded the system to Tropical Storm 03W, and on the same day, PAGASA classified it as Tropical Depression Batibot. Soon after, the convection decreased from the center, and by May 20, all warning agencies had discontinued advisories.

Typhoon Chan-hom 

Midday on May 18, the JTWC began to monitor an area of persistent disturbed weather associated with a broad low-pressure area southwest of Chuuk. Within highly conductive conditions, the disturbance quickly organized and became classified as a tropical depression at 0000 UTC the following day. In its initial stages, the depression tracked slowly northeastwards. However, a shortwave trough forced a weakness in a nearby ridge, allowing for the storm to take a more streamlined, northward path. At 1200 UTC on May 20, the JMA upgraded the depression to Tropical Storm Chan-hom. Following the system's naming, Chan-hom temporarily meandered towards the northwest before resuming its northeasterly track. The next day, the storm began to develop an eye; this was reflected with an upgrade by the JMA to typhoon status at 0600 UTC on May 23.

Following peak intensity, Chan-hom began to intake dry air beginning on May 25. At roughly the same time, the typhoon began to weaken and accelerate towards the northeast. Conditions continued to worsen as the storm moved further north, and as the cyclone passed east of Minamitorishima, it was downgraded to tropical storm classification. By this time, Chan-hom had lost much of its convection due to wind shear. Early on May 27, Chan-hom had fully transitioned into an extratropical cyclone, and these remnants continued to track towards the northeast. These extratropical remnants dissipated south of the Aleutian Islands the following day. Early in the typhoon's existence, Chan-hom posed a potential threat to Guam, but remained well east of the island. However, after passing to the northeast, winds from the typhoon fanned volcanic ash from the recently erupting Anatahan volcano towards the island, prompting precautionary measures in Guam. Ashfalls were reported on the island, forcing the cancellation of several flights. As a tropical storm, Chan-hom caused some damage to homes and crops on Chuuk, mostly due to heavy rains brought forth by the storm. Offshore, a 1,040 ton fishing vessel, the Nien Feioch, sank during the storm. The ship was valued at $16 million.

Severe Tropical Storm Linfa (Chedeng) 

Tropical Storm Linfa developed as a tropical depression just off the western coast of Luzon on May 25. The disturbance quickly intensified to reach tropical storm intensity a few hours after cyclogenesis. However, intensification leveled off as Linfa executed a small clockwise loop before a subsequent landfall on Luzon on May 27. Due to land interaction the storm temporarily weakened and decoupled before reforming in the Philippine Sea. Following its peak the tropical storm began to deteriorate and transitioned into an extratropical cyclone on May 30; these extratropical remnants continued to track northward through Japan before dissipating in the Sea of Okhotsk on June 4.

The erratic and slow movement of Linfa off the western Philippines was the catalyst for extreme rainfall and flooding, killing 41 persons in the archipelago. Precipitation peaked at  near Dagupan. Rising floodwaters resulted in the temporary shutdown of government offices and numerous mudslides. In addition, strong winds caused widespread power outages. Overall damage from Linfa in the Philippines amounted to ₱192.3 million (US$3.65 million). The floods also displaced 8,367 people in 1,686 families and destroyed 178 homes. Linfa and its extratropical remnants later brought torrential rainfall and widespread flooding to Japan, particularly in southwestern regions. Flood damage was worst in Kōchi and Tokushima Prefectures, where several buildings were destroyed by floodwater. Other locations in Japan experienced considerable agricultural damage as well as numerous landslides. Overall, Linfa caused roughly $28.2 million in damage, much of which occurred in Japan, though the entirety of deaths associated with the cyclone took place in the Philippines.

Severe Tropical Storm Nangka (Dodong) 

In late May, an area of disturbed weather began to persist in the South China Sea. The JTWC began to monitor the storm cluster on May 29. The following day, the JMA reclassified the system as a tropical depression; initially the system remained highly disorganized due to the lack of deep convection. Persistent moderate wind shear and dry air prevented the cyclone from strengthening significantly in the storm's early stages. These conditions abated as the depression tracked northeast, and at 0000 UTC on June 1, the JMA upgraded the system to Tropical Storm Nangka.

However, upon moving through the Bashi Channel, conditions began to deteriorate due to increased wind shear, weakening the system and resulting in its downgrade to tropical depression status by the JMA at 1200 UTC on June 3. Nangka continued to become increasingly disorganized as it moved further north, and late that day, the depression transitioned to an extratropical cyclone. The resulting remnants continued to track well east of Japan before dissipating on June 7.

Typhoon Soudelor (Egay) 

A tropical disturbance persisted in the monsoon trough northwest of Pohnpei on June 7, and moved westward without development due to wind shear. On June 11, the shear decreased enough to allow the convection to organize, and the next day the JMA classified it as a tropical depression northeast of Palau. On June 13, the JMA upgraded it to Tropical Storm Soudelor to the east of the Philippines, and PAGASA gave it the local name "Egay". Soudelor moved to the northwest and later to the north, parallel to the eastern Philippines, and on June 17, the JMA upgraded it to typhoon status. The storm rapidly intensified to the east of Taiwan as it developed a well-defined eye, and while doing so passed over the Japanese island of Iriomote-jima at around 2030 UTC on June 17. Increased shear weakened the typhoon to tropical storm strengthen on June 19, and later that day the JMA declared the storm as extratropical near the Oki Islands. The extratropical remnants of Soudelor continued to the northeast, crossing northern Japan on June 20 and dissipating on June 24.

While offshore the Philippines, Soudelor dropped heavy rainfall that caused flooding and left thousands homeless. The storm caused ₱131 million (PHP, US$2.46 million) in damage and 12 deaths. On the Japanese island of Iriomote-jima, where wind gusts reached . It also affected Taiwan, where floods covered highways and caused mudslides. In Japan, the storm caused widespread power outages, although damage was minimal, and there were 21 injuries. In South Korea, there was $12.1 million in damage and two deaths.

Typhoon Imbudo (Harurot) 

A subtropical ridge near Okinawa steered the nascent depression to the west-northwest for much of its duration. With warm waters and favorable upper-level conditions, the depression quickly organized, first to Tropical Storm Imbudo on July 17, and to typhoon status two days later, when PAGASA begin issuing advisories on Typhoon Harurot. Around that time, Imbudo was rapidly intensifying, developing a well-defined eye. Imbudo maintained peak winds for about 12 hours, before undergoing an eyewall replacement cycle. It weakened over land, but re-intensified in the South China Sea, striking southern China near Yangjiang, Guangdong on July 24. Imbudo rapidly weakened, dissipating on July 25.

In the Philippines, officials evacuated over 14,000 people. Imbudo was the strongest typhoon to strike since Typhoon Zeb five years prior, The typhoon left widespread areas flooded for several days. Damage was heaviest in the Cagayan Valley, where over 80,000 people were displaced by the storm. In Isabela, high winds wrecked most of the banana crop and severely damaged other crops. Throughout the Philippines, Imbudo damaged or destroyed 62,314 houses, causing P4.7 billion (2003 PHP, $86 million 2003 USD) in damage. There were 64 deaths in the country. In southern China in Yangjiang, more than 30,000 people evacuated ahead of the storm, and more than half of the trees in the city fell due to strong winds. High winds killed a man in Hong Kong after knocking him off a platform. Throughout Guangdong, Imbudo destroyed 595,000 houses and caused eight deaths. There, 12 people died from the storm. Overall damage in China was about ¥4.45 billion (CNY, $297 million USD).

Severe Tropical Storm Koni (Gilas) 

Koni originated from a tropical depression situated within the monsoon trough to the east of the Philippines on July 15. Tracking westward, intensification was slow and the system remained a tropical depression as it moved across the central Philippines on July 17. However, atmospheric conditions began to deteriorate as Koni made landfall on Hainan on July 21, weakening the system. The tropical storm continued to weaken as it moved over the Gulf of Tonkin prior to a final landfall near Hanoi, Vietnam the following day. Tracking inland, the combination of land interaction and wind shear caused Koni to dissipate over Laos on July 23.

Shortly after development, Koni tracked through the Philippines, killing two people. After moving into the South China Sea, turbulence produced by the storm resulted in an aviation incident involving a commercial airliner off the western Philippines. Three of the plane's occupants received minor injuries. The rains resulted in the collapse of 1,400 homes and an estimated CN¥140.27 million (US$16.9 million) in direct economic losses. Effects were worst in Vietnam, where three people were killed. Widespread power outages occurred, and strong winds resulted in agricultural and infrastructural damage, particularly in Vietnam's northern provinces.

Tropical Storm Morakot (Juaning) 

Morakot spawned from an area of disturbed weather in the Philippine Sea on July 31. Tracking northwest, favorable conditions allowed for the intensification of the system to tropical storm strength on August 2. This intensity was held for several hours until less conducive atmospheric conditions slightly weakened the system; this was followed by Morakot making landfall on southern Taiwan on August 3. Subsequently, the storm weakened and moved into the Taiwan Strait before making its final landfall near Quanzhou, China the next day. The storm quickly weakened over the Chinese mainland, and dissipated entirely several hours after landfall.

In Taiwan, where Morakot first made landfall, heavy rainfall resulted in flooding. Commercial flights, schools, and rail service in some areas was cancelled in advance of the storm. Crop damage also resulted from the rainfall, and was estimated at over NT$70 million (US$2 million). In China, record rainfall was reported. The worst impacted city was Quanzhou, where losses due to Morakot reached CN¥240 million (US$29 million) and one death was reported. Power outages were also widespread across southeastern China. Due to preexisting drought conditions, 703 cloud seeding operations took place in order to artificially generate added rainfall; such operations resulted in moderate precipitation over the targeted area. Overall, Morakot caused roughly $31 million in damage and three deaths.

Typhoon Etau (Kabayan) 

A tropical depression developed on August 2 southeast of Guam, and gradually intensified while moving to the northwest, becoming a tropical storm on August 3 and a typhoon a day later. Etau formed an eye and became a large storm by the time it approached Okinawa on August 7. The typhoon attained peak winds of  before weakening slightly while turning to the northeast. Etau made landfall on the Japanese island of Shikoku on August 8, and later moved across portions of Honshu and Hokkaido. After weakening to tropical storm status, the cyclone became extratropical on August 9 and dissipated three days later.

While passing northeast of the Philippines, the typhoon caused light damage in the archipelago. The eye crossed over Okinawa, where Etau left 166,800 people without power and caused 10 injuries. The combination of winds and rainfall caused landslides, particularly on Hokkaido. Nationwide, Etau killed 20 people, destroyed 708 houses, and caused ¥35.1 billion (JPY, $294.8 million USD) in damage.

Typhoon Krovanh (Niña) 

Krovanh originated from a tropical disturbance within the monsoon trough east of Chuuk State on August 13. Despite rather favorable conditions, the initial tropical depression did not intensify significantly and degenerated into a remnant low on August 18. However, these remnants were able to reorganize and the system was reclassified as a tropical cyclone a day later. Intensification was rather rapid upon the storm's reformation – the depression reached tropical storm status on August 20 and then typhoon intensity two days later. The typhoon emerged into the South China Sea as a much weaker tropical storm, though it was able to restrengthen over warm waters. Once again at typhoon intensity, Krovanh clipped Hainan before moving over the Leizhou Peninsula on its way to a final landfall near Cẩm Phả, Vietnam on August 25. Quick weakening due to land interaction occurred as Krovanh moved across northern Vietnam, where the storm met its demise the following day.

Krovanh first struck the Philippines, resulting in heavy rainfall and displacing approximately 1,000 families. The flooding caused severe damage and killed one person. Krovanh's effects were much more severe in China. In Hong Kong, eleven people were injured and isolated flooding occurred as a result of the typhoon's outer rainbands. However, Guangdong Province, Hainan Province, and Guangxi were the Chinese regions most extensively impacted. The typhoon brought record wind gusts into Guangxi. In those three regions combined, 13,000 homes were estimated to have collapsed and a large swath of farmland was damaged. Two people were killed in China and economic losses approximated to ¥2.1 billion (US$253 million). Due to its positioning and track, of all areas in Vietnam only the country's more northern regions were impacted by Krovanh. Flash flooding occurred in earnest in those regions, and 1,000 homes were flattened. One person was killed and five others were injured in Vietnam. Overall, the typhoon was responsible for the deaths of four persons.

Tropical Storm Vamco (Manang) 

The monsoon trough spawned several tropical disturbances in the middle of August, one of which became Tropical Depression Lakay near the Philippines. On August 18, an area of convection persisted on the southern side of a circulation, developing into a tropical depression east of Luzon. It moved quickly northward and later to the northwest in an area generally unfavorable for strengthening, such as the presence of wind shear and land interaction. On August 19, the JMA upgraded the depression to Tropical Storm Vamco to the east of Taiwan. On August 20, the JMA assessed Vamco as dissipating in the Taiwan Strait, although the JTWC continued advisories until the storm moved ashore in southeastern China.

Rainfall in Taiwan reached  in Ilan County. On the island, the storm left several hundred houses without power due to a lightning strike. The storm damaged or destroyed 5,880 houses and flooded  of paddy fields, causing ¥38.6 million (CNY, US$4.7 million) in damage.

Typhoon Dujuan (Onyok) 

On August 29, the JMA upgraded it to Tropical Storm Dujuan, and that day PAGASA began issuing advisories on Tropical Storm Onyok. The storm quickly intensified into a typhoon, after developing an eye in the center. The typhoon weakened steadily and was a severe tropical storm by the time it made landfall on September 2 just east of Hong Kong. Dujuan rapidly weakened while continuing westward through China, dissipating on September 3 over Guangxi.

In the Philippines, Dujuan interacted with the monsoon to produce heavy rainfall, killing one person. The caused about NT$200 (NWD, $115 million USD) in crop damage, and killed three people. Damage was minor in Hong Kong, and four fishermen were missing and presumed drowned after their boat sank. On the Chinese mainland, strong winds left 90% of the city of Shenzhen without power, and killed 16 construction workers due to a half-finished building collapsing. Across Guangdong, the typhoon damaged crops and destroyed 54,000 homes were destroyed. Overall damage in China was estimated at ¥2.3 billion (CNY, US$277 million), and across Guangdong, the typhoon killed 40 people.

Typhoon Maemi (Pogi) 

Typhoon Maemi formed on September 4 from the monsoon trough in the western Pacific Ocean. It slowly intensified into a tropical storm while moving northwestward, and Maemi became a typhoon on September 8. While near peak intensity, Maemi was decelerating and began turning to the north-northeast. With warm waters, Maemi was able to maintain much of its intensity before it made landfall just west of Busan, South Korea on September 12. The typhoon became extratropical in the Sea of Japan the next day, although the remnants persisted for several more days, bringing strong winds to northern Japan.

The typhoon first affected the Ryukyu Islands of Japan. On Miyako-jima, strong winds damaged 104 buildings, and 95% of residents lost power. One person died on Miyako-jima after being struck by flying glass. Elsewhere in Japan, the storm caused flights to be canceled, while rainfall-induced landslides blocked roads. There were two other deaths in Japan, and damage totaled ¥11.3 billion (JPY, $96 million USD). Damage was heaviest in South Korea, notably where it moved ashore. Winds in Busan near the landfall location reached , the second-highest on record. There, the port sustained heavy damage, causing disruptions to exports in the months following the storm. Nationwide, the high winds destroyed about 5,000 houses and damaged 13,000 homes and businesses, leaving 25,000 people homeless. About 1.47 million lost power, and widespread crop damage occurred, resulting in the worst rice crop in 23 years. Across South Korea, Maemi killed 117 people, and overall damage totaled ₩5.52 trillion won (US$4.8 billion).

Typhoon Choi-wan (Roskas) 

In the middle of September, the monsoon trough spawned a rapidly organizing disturbance east-northeast of Luzon, with weak wind shear and favorable conditions. On September 16, the JMA classified it as a tropical depression, and the JTWC initiated advisories the next day. The system moved to the northwest due to the subtropical ridge to the northeast and later to the north. On September 18, the JMA upgraded the depression to Tropical Storm Choi-wan, the same day that PAGASA classified it as Tropical Storm Roskas (the only time this name was used, as it was retired the following year). An eastward-moving trough turned the storm to the northeast, bringing the track over Okinawa and Amami Ōshima on September 19. Choi-wan continued gradually intensifying, becoming a typhoon on September 20 to the southeast of Japan. The typhoon weakened due to increasing wind shear, deteriorating to severe tropical storm status on September 22 before JMA declared it extratropical on September 23. The remnants of Choi-wan continued to the northeast, exited the basin on September 24, and eventually struck southern Alaska on September 25.

Wind gusts in Okinawa reached , while on the volcanic island of Hachijō-jima, gusts reached . In Okinawa, Choi-wan flooded a boat, forcing its occupants to be rescued by the Coast Guard. Also on the island, heavy rainfall caused landslides and flooded houses. In Amami Ōshima, the storm left 10,810 people without power. On Hachijō, wind gusts of  damaged about 200 houses. Nationwide, Choi-wan destroyed 191 homes, injured 9 people, and left about ¥300 million (JPY, US$2.5 million).

Typhoon Koppu (Sikat) 

Towards the end of September, the monsoon trough spawned a tropical disturbance east-northeast of Yap, which became a tropical depression on September 24. There were initially several circulations, with a tropical upper tropospheric trough to the northeast increasing outflow. After slowing and turning to the northeast, the depression intensified into Tropical Storm Koppu on September 26. After the storm developed a large eye feature, the JTWC upgraded it to typhoon status on September 27, although the JMA did not follow suit until the following day while near Chichi-jima. The convection diminished near the center, causing Koppu to become extratropical on September 30. The remnants continued generally northeastward through the Aleutian Islands, eventually passing south of mainland Alaska on October 7.

Rainfall there reached .

Tropical Depression 18W 

On October 6, the JTWC classified Tropical Depression 18W early in the month off the west coast of Luzon. With weak steering currents, the system moved slowly southwestward before looping to the northwest. On October 10, the depression dissipated just off the coast of southern China.

Tropical Depression 19W 

Following the demise of 18W, the JTWC monitored Tropical Depression 19W, which developed on October 12 after an extratropical storm produced an area of convection. Described as a subtropical low, the depression moved generally northeastward toward Japan due to an approaching cold front. The depression moved through Kyushu and Honshu before dissipating on October 13.

The depression dropped  of rainfall in Kōchi, while strong winds associated reached  through a storm-produced downburst. The winds knocked over two cranes, killing two people, and left about 9,000 homes without power. The depression also killed two people due to drownings.

Typhoon Ketsana (Tisoy) 

In the middle of October, an area of convection persisted along the monsoon trough between Luzon and Guam, developing into a tropical depression on October 17. The same monsoon trough later spawned Typhoon Parma to the east. For several days, the system remained disorganized while drifting to the west-northwest due to weak steering currents south of the subtropical ridge. On October 19, the JMA upgraded the depression to Tropical Storm Ketsana, and by that time the storm had begun drifting to the northeast. Subsequently, the typhoon accelerated northeastward into the westerlies and began weakening due to increasing wind shear and dry air. On October 26, Ketsana became extratropical to the east of Japan and dissipated the next day. The passage of the typhoon caused surface chlorophyll a concentration in the ocean to increase 30-fold.

Typhoon Parma 

The same monsoon trough that spawned Typhoon Koppu also produced an area of convection to the north-northeast of Guam, becoming a tropical depression on October 19. The system moved northwestward and later turned to the northeast around the subtropical ridge. With low wind shear and favorable outflow, the convection became better organized, and the JMA upgraded it to Tropical Storm Parma on October 21. After an eye began to form, Parma was upgraded to typhoon status the next day. An approaching trough caused Parma to accelerate northeastward while also increasing outflow. The cold front had passed to the north and failed to bring the typhoon northeastward.

Increasing wind shear weakened the convection, and Parma deteriorated into a severe tropical storm on October 26. The next day, the typhoon turned to the northeast due to another approaching trough. With decreasing wind shear and warmer waters, Parma re-intensified significantly on October 29, reaching a secondary peak of  according to JMA, and  according to JTWC. The storm moved very closely along the track it took several days prior. Increasing wind shear on October 30 caused rapid weakening, resulting in the eye dissipating. By the next day, the center was exposed, and Parma became extratropical, later exiting the basin on November 1. The remnants weakened, later turning to the southeast and dissipating on November 11 southwest of California.

Tropical Depression 23W 

On October 21, a monsoon trough spawned a tropical depression in the Gulf of Thailand, which moved northwestward and crossed into the Indian Ocean, dropping heavy rainfall in Thailand.

Tropical Depression 22W (Ursula) 

On October 22, a tropical depression developed in the South China Sea, classified by PAGASA as Ursula. The system moved eastward and crossed Palawan before dissipating on October 24. In the Philippines, the depression killed one person and caused minor damage.

Severe Tropical Storm Melor (Viring) 

Late in October, an area of convection persisted northwest of Palau and quickly organized into a tropical depression on October 29. Moving west-northwestward toward the Philippines due to a ridge to the east, the depression intensified into Tropical Storm Melor on October 30. With minimal wind shear, the storm strengthened further and developed a large eye. Early on November 1, Melor made landfall on northeastern Luzon in the Philippines, south of Palanan. The storm weakened over land and emerged into the South China Sea. By that time, it was moving northward along the periphery of the ridge to the east. On November 2, Melor turned to the northeast, passing just east of Taiwan. The next day, it weakened to tropical depression status, and after meandering offshore eastern Taiwan, Melor continued northeastward. It became extratropical on November 5 and dissipated the next day near southern Japan.

In Taiwan, rainfall reached  in Pingtung County. On the Japanese island of Hateruma, rainfall totaled , which broke the hourly and daily record for the station in November.

Typhoon Nepartak (Weng) 

A tropical depression developed near Yap on November 11. The system intensified gradually as it tracked quickly westward toward the Philippines. An anticyclone aloft allowed for strengthening, and the JMA upgraded the depression to Tropical Storm Nepartak on November 12. Simultaneously, the cyclone entered the area of responsibility of the Philippine Atmospheric, Geophysical and Astronomical Services Administration, which named it Tropical Storm Weng. At around 1600 UTC on November 13, Nepartak made landfall on northern Samar Island in the Philippines before traversing the remainder of the archipelago from east to west. The cyclone emerged into the South China Sea weakened but quickly re-intensified while continuing to the west-northwest. On November 18, Nepartak passed near southwestern Hainan and weakened, with the convection diminishing from the circulation. By the next day, the system weakened to tropical depression status, and dissipated shortly after moving ashore over Beihai, China.

In the Philippines, Nepartak produced strong winds, heavy rainfall, and rough seas. The storm caused widespread power outages and ferry disruptions. According to the PAGASA in its post-storm report, a total of 13 people died during the storm. On Hainan, the storm helped end one of the worst summer droughts in almost 65 years, although it also left heavy crop damage, wrecking  of fields and killing 400 head of livestock. With about 800 homes destroyed, damage on Hainan amounted to $197 million (2003 USD). Effects were minor in mainland China.

Typhoon Lupit (Yoyoy) 

Typhoon Lupit formed on November 18 from the monsoon trough to the west of the Marshall Islands. Early in its duration, it moved generally to the west or west-southwest. On November 21, the depression intensified into Tropical Storm Lupit, and two days later, it strengthened into a typhoon, developing an eye. Lupit later began a prolonged movement to the northwest, during which it passed near several islands in Yap State. It later weakened due to a variety of unfavorable conditions, and after recurving to the northeast, Lupit became extratropical south of Japan on December 2.

Typhoon Lupit first affected Pohnpei with gusty winds, and later it damaged or destroyed about 200 homes in Chuuk State. There, high waves flooded roads and homes, while high winds damaged crops. Damage was heaviest in Yap State, mostly in the small Ulithi atoll and Fais Island. On both islands, the typhoon contaminated the water supply and wrecked the crops. Rainfall reached  on Ulithi, and gusts reached . Throughout the FSM, damage totaled about $1.7 million, although there were no deaths. The damage prompted the FSM government to declare two states as disaster areas, as well as a disaster declaration from the United States federal government. While Lupit was becoming extratropical, it became the first typhoon in December to threaten Japan in 13 years. The storm dropped rainfall that resulted in mudslides and flight cancellations.

Tropical Depression 27W (Zigzag) 

The final system of the year was a tropical depression that originated out of the monsoon trough on December 24 east of the Philippines. After initially moving to the west, it turned to the south, and the JTWC estimated the depression intensified into a tropical storm. During this time, PAGASA classified it as Tropical Storm Zigzag. The system made landfall in northeastern Mindanao and dissipated on December 27, bringing heavy rainfall.

Other systems 
On July 9, PAGASA classified a system as Tropical Depression Falcon, off the west coast of the Philippines. The JMA also briefly initiated advisories before dropping them later on July 9. Later in the month, PAGASA briefly issued advisories on Tropical Depression Ineng on July 30 off the east coast of Mindanao. The depression dissipated the next day, causing about P8 million (PHP, US$145,000) in damage. The monsoon trough spawned a tropical depression north of Luzon on August 18, with PAGASA naming it Lakay. There were several circulations in the region, with Tropical Storm Vamco to the northeast near Taiwan, and the overall system moved generally westward. PAGASA briefly classified Lakay as a tropical storm on August 19 before ending advisories the next day. The system spread rainfall across China, reaching  in Xiamen, Fujuan.

On September 5, former Hurricane Jimena crossed the International Date Line into the basin. By that time, the circulation was largely exposed from the convection, and the center quickly dissipated. Later in the month, the monsoon trough spawned a disturbance east of the Philippines that PAGASA classified as Tropical Depression Quiel on September 15. The system moved westward but never intensified, dissipating west of Luzon on September 19. The broad system also spawned Typhoon Choi-wan.

On October 16, the JMA briefly classified a tropical depression to the east of the Marianas Islands. Also in October, the monsoon trough spawned a tropical depression in the Gulf of Thailand, which moved northwestward and crossed into the Indian Ocean, dropping heavy rainfall in Thailand.

In mid-November, the JMA briefly tracked a weak tropical depression near Wake Island. The agency also briefly tracked a tropical depression off the coast of Vietnam on December 16. It finally dissipated on December 17, with the pressure and winds unknown.

Storm names 
Within the North-western Pacific Ocean, both the Japan Meteorological Agency (JMA) and the Philippine Atmospheric, Geophysical and Astronomical Services Administration assign names to tropical cyclones that develop in the Western Pacific, which can result in a tropical cyclone having two names. While the Philippine Atmospheric, Geophysical and Astronomical Services Administration assigns names to tropical cyclones which move into or form as a tropical depression in their area of responsibility located between 135°E and 115°E and between 5°N-25°N even if the cyclone has had an international name assigned to it. The names of significant tropical cyclones are retired, by both PAGASA and the Typhoon Committee. Should the list of names for the Philippine region be exhausted then names will be taken from an auxiliary list of which the first ten are published each season.

International names 

During the season 21 named tropical cyclones developed in the Western Pacific and were named by the Japan Meteorological Agency, when it was determined that they had become tropical storms. These names were contributed to a list of a 140 names submitted by the fourteen members nations and territories of the ESCAP/WMO Typhoon Committee. All of these names were used for the first (and only, in the cases of Yanyan, Imbudo, Koni, and Maemi) time this year.

Philippines 

The Philippine Atmospheric, Geophysical and Astronomical Services Administration uses its own naming scheme for tropical cyclones in their area of responsibility. PAGASA assigns names to tropical depressions that form within their area of responsibility and any tropical cyclone that might move into their area of responsibility. Should the list of names for a given year prove to be insufficient, names are taken from an auxiliary list, the first 10 of which are published each year before the season starts. The names not retired from this list will be used again in the 2007 season. After the season, the names Batibot, Gilas, Lakay, Manang, Niña, Pogi, Roskas, and Sikat were replaced with Bebeng, Goring, Lando, Mina, Nonoy, Pedring, Ramon, and Sendong for unknown reasons.

Retirement 

The names Imbudo and Maemi were retired by the ESCAP/WMO Typhoon Committee. The names Molave and Mujigae were chosen to replace Imbudo and Maemi respectively. While Yanyan was requested by Hong Kong to be removed in the list, and was replaced by Dolphin.
The Philippine Atmospheric, Geophysical and Astronomical Services Administration (PAGASA) announced that the name Harurot had its name retired due to extensive damage. The name Hanna was chosen to replace Harurot. Also, the name "Koni" was replaced by "Goni", after it was found that Koni was a misspelling.

Storm effects 
The following table provides basic meteorological and impact information for each tropical cyclone from the 2003 Pacific typhoon season in tabular format; unnamed tropical cyclones are not included. PAGASA names for storms are provided in parentheses. Storms entering from the Central Pacific only include their information while in the western Pacific, and are noted with an asterisk *.

|-
| Yanyan ||  || bgcolor=#| || bgcolor=#| || bgcolor=#| || None affected || None ||  None || 
|-
| Kujira (Amang) ||  || bgcolor=#| || bgcolor=#| || bgcolor=#| || Micronesia, Philippines, Taiwan, Japan || ||  || 
|-
| TD ||  || bgcolor=#| || bgcolor=#| || bgcolor=#| || Philippines || None ||  None ||
|-
| 03W (Batibot) ||  || bgcolor=#| || bgcolor=#| || bgcolor=#| || Philippines || None ||  None ||
|-
| TD ||  || bgcolor=#| || bgcolor=#| || bgcolor=#| || None affected || None ||  None ||
|-
| Chan-hom ||  || bgcolor=#| || bgcolor=#| || bgcolor=#| || Chuuk, Guam || ||  None ||
|-
| Linfa (Chedeng) ||  || bgcolor=#| || bgcolor=#| || bgcolor=#| || Philippines, Japan || ||  ||
|-
| Nangka (Dodong) ||  || bgcolor=#| || bgcolor=#| || bgcolor=#| || Taiwan, Philippines, Japan || None ||  None ||
|-
| Soudelor (Egay) ||  || bgcolor=#| || bgcolor=#| || bgcolor=#||| Philippines, Taiwan, Japan, South Korea || ||  ||
|-
| Falcon ||  || bgcolor=#| || bgcolor=#| || bgcolor=#||| None affected || None ||  None ||
|-
| Koni (Gilas) ||  || bgcolor=#||| bgcolor=#| || bgcolor=#||| Philippines, China, Vietnam || ||  ||
|-
| Imbudo (Harurot) ||  || bgcolor=#||| bgcolor=#| || bgcolor=#||| Philippines, China || ||  ||
|-
| Ineng ||  || bgcolor=#| || bgcolor=#| || bgcolor=#||| Philippines || ||  None ||
|-
| Morakot (Juaning) ||  || bgcolor=#||| bgcolor=#| || bgcolor=#||| Taiwan, China || ||  ||
|-
| TD ||  || bgcolor=#| || bgcolor=#| || bgcolor=#| || None affected || None ||  None ||
|-
| Etau (Kabayan) ||  || bgcolor=#||| bgcolor=#| || bgcolor=#||| Palau, Guam, Okinawa, Japan || ||  ||
|-
| Krovanh (Niña) ||  || bgcolor=#||| bgcolor=#| || bgcolor=#||| Philippines, China, Vietnam || ||  ||
|-
| TD ||  || bgcolor=#| || bgcolor=#| || bgcolor=#| || Philippines || None ||  None ||
|-
| Vamco (Manang) ||  || bgcolor=#||| bgcolor=#| || bgcolor=#||| Philippines, Taiwan, China || ||  None ||
|-
| Lakay ||  || bgcolor=#| || bgcolor=#| || bgcolor=#||| Philippines, Taiwan, China || None ||  None ||
|-
| TD ||  || bgcolor=#| || bgcolor=#| || bgcolor=#| || None affected || None ||  None ||
|-
| TD ||  || bgcolor=#| || bgcolor=#| || bgcolor=#| || None affected || None ||  None ||
|-
| Dujuan (Onyok) ||  || bgcolor=#||| bgcolor=#| || bgcolor=#||| Philippines, Okinawa, Taiwan, China || ||  ||
|-
| TD ||  || bgcolor=#| || bgcolor=#| || bgcolor=#| || None affected || None ||  None ||
|-
| Maemi (Pogi) ||  || bgcolor=#||| bgcolor=#| || bgcolor=#||| Japan, South Korea, North Korea || ||  ||
|-
| TD ||  || bgcolor=#| || bgcolor=#| || bgcolor=#| || Vietnam || None ||  None ||
|-
| TD ||  || bgcolor=#| || bgcolor=#| || bgcolor=#| || None affected || None ||  None ||
|-
| TD ||  || bgcolor=#| || bgcolor=#| || bgcolor=#| || South China || None ||  None ||
|-
| Quiel ||  || bgcolor=#| || bgcolor=#| || bgcolor=#||| Philippines || None ||  None ||
|-
| Choi-wan (Roskas) ||  || bgcolor=#||| bgcolor=#| || bgcolor=#||| Japan || ||  None ||
|-
| Koppu (Sikat) ||  || bgcolor=#||| bgcolor=#| || bgcolor=#||| None affected || None ||  None ||
|-
| TD ||  || bgcolor=#| || bgcolor=#| || bgcolor=#| || Taiwan || None ||  None ||
|-
| 18W ||  || bgcolor=#| || bgcolor=#| || bgcolor=#| || South China || None ||  None ||
|-
| 19W ||  || bgcolor=#| || bgcolor=#| || bgcolor=#| || South China || None || 2 ||
|-
| TD ||  || bgcolor=#| || bgcolor=#| || bgcolor=#| || None affected || None ||  None ||
|-
| Ketsana (Tisoy) ||  || bgcolor=#||| bgcolor=#| || bgcolor=#||| None affected || None ||  None ||
|-
| Parma ||  || bgcolor=#||| bgcolor=#| || bgcolor=#||| None affected || None ||  None ||
|-
| 23W ||  || bgcolor=#| || bgcolor=#| || bgcolor=#||| Thailand || ||  ||
|-
| 22W (Ursula) ||  || bgcolor=#| || bgcolor=#| || bgcolor=#||| Philippines || ||  ||
|-
| Melor (Viring) ||  || bgcolor=#||| bgcolor=#| || bgcolor=#||| Philippines, Taiwan, Japan || None ||  ||
|-
| Nepartak (Weng) ||  || bgcolor=#||| bgcolor=#| || bgcolor=#||| Philippines, Vietnam, China ||  ||  ||
|-
| TD ||  || bgcolor=#| || bgcolor=#| || bgcolor=#||| None affected || None || None ||
|-
| TD ||  || bgcolor=#| || bgcolor=#| || bgcolor=#||| None affected || None || None ||
|-
| Lupit (Yoyoy) ||  || bgcolor=#||| bgcolor=#| || bgcolor=#||| Micronesia, Japan ||  ||  None ||
|-
| TD ||  || bgcolor=#| || bgcolor=#| || bgcolor=#||| None affected || None || None ||
|-
| 27W (Zigzag) ||  || bgcolor=#| || bgcolor=#| || bgcolor=#||| Philippines || None || None ||
|-

See also 

 Tropical cyclones in 2003
 Pacific typhoon season
 2003 Atlantic hurricane season
 2003 Pacific hurricane season
 2003 North Indian Ocean cyclone season
 South-West Indian Ocean cyclone seasons: 2002–03, 2003–04
 Australian region cyclone seasons: 2002–03, 2003–04
 South Pacific cyclone seasons: 2002–03, 2003–04

Notes

References

External links 

 Satellite movie of 2003 Pacific typhoon season
 Japan Meteorological Agency
 China Meteorological Agency
 National Weather Service Guam
 Hong Kong Observatory
 Macau Meteorological Geophysical Services
 Korea Meteorological Agency
 Philippine Atmospheric, Geophysical and Astronomical Services Administration
 Taiwan Central Weather Bureau
 Joint Typhoon Warning Center 

 
Pacific typhoon seasons
2003 EPac